The DeploraBall was an unofficial inaugural ball event organized by GOTV group MAGA3X and held at the National Press Club in Washington, D.C., on the evening of January 19, 2017, to celebrate the victory and inauguration of Donald Trump. The event fomented controversy due to its alleged association with members of the alt-right, and triggered violent protests outside the venue while the event went on as scheduled inside. In addition to the MAGA3X event, the "DeploraBall" name has also been used to refer to additional events for Trump supporters in Washington, D.C., and other locations. The name is a play on Hillary Clinton's "basket of deplorables" comment made during her 2016 presidential election campaign.

Background
"DeploraBall" was conceived in early November 2016 by a marketing team as a brand name for various parties and events celebrating the election of Donald Trump. Among the organizers were Jack Posobiec, Jeff Giesea, and Mike Cernovich. The loosely organized GOTV group MAGA3X became one of the first sponsors of a DeploraBall event, which MAGA3X originally announced would be held on January 19, 2017, (the night before the Trump inauguration) at the Clarendon Ballroom in Arlington, Virginia. After MAGA3X had sold over 500 tickets, the Ballroom declined to host the event, stating that no event contract had been signed and that the venue had decided not to issue a contract "due to the suspicious actions of the organizers" in selling tickets before a contract was in place; however, event organizers alleged that the Ballroom had acquiesced to pressure from Hillary Clinton supporters. The Ballroom subsequently became "overwhelmed" with harassing phone calls and threats, although Arlington County police said there were no "credible" threats.

MAGA3X then announced that the event would move to the National Press Club. Following the change of venue, one of the original organizers, Tim Treadstone (known online as "Baked Alaska"), was reportedly banned from the DeploraBall by Cernovich and Giesea after posting "anti-Semitic and racist comments" on Twitter, sparking an online argument with Cernovich. White supremacist Richard Spencer, who had recently made news for leading a group Nazi salute during a pro-Trump conference at a restaurant, was also uninvited from the event. Cernovich subsequently told TMZ that racist gestures, such as the Nazi salute, were banned from the event. Images of Pepe the Frog were also banned. Other MAGA3X organizers also made statements disavowing any affiliation between the DeploraBall and white nationalism. The organizers' limitations on speech and banning of Treadstone and Spencer were criticized by some alt-right members as bowing to mainstream pressure. Both the outgoing and the incoming presidents of the National Press Club stated that the club would hold the private event in honor of the incoming President Trump "as we have for incoming presidents of both parties for decades", but would neither endorse nor sponsor the event.

Event
On the evening of January 19, 2017, the MAGA3X DeploraBall event was held at the National Press Building (the Washington, D.C. headquarters of the National Press Club). The event had sold out its 1000-ticket capacity in advance. Although journalist Milo Yiannopoulos had been invited, he did not attend. Political consultant Roger Stone arrived at the venue, but left without entering the event after learning the organizers had not provided sufficient tickets for his family members accompanying him. The event was broadcast live by Right Side Broadcasting Network. To mark the conclusion of DeploraBall, Scott LoBaido painted a "live-speed" portrait of Donald Trump.

A second Washington, D.C.-area inaugural ball dubbed "Gays for Trump DeploraBall Gala" was held at the Bolger Center Hotel in Potomac, Maryland, on the following evening, January 20, 2017. The event was attended by over 200 people. Another "Gays for Trump DeploraBall" was planned to be held on July 4, 2017; however, the event was renamed and pushed back to July 1. Additional inaugural events using the DeploraBall name took place in other US locales, including California, North Carolina, Arizona, and Ohio. According to the official DeploraBall marketing website, over 50 DeploraBall events were held nationwide and in three countries around the time of the Trump inauguration.

Attendees included Milwaukee sheriff David Clarke, activist James O'Keefe, businessman Martin Shkreli, and social media personalities Mike Cernovich, Jim Hoft, and Gavin McInnes.

A similarly named inaugural celebration called the "Deplorables Inaugural Ball" was organized by Deplorables Nation and took place at the Ronald Reagan Building and International Trade Center on the evening of January 19, 2017.

Protests
A few weeks before the DeploraBall, members of Project Veritas infiltrated meetings of the protest groups DisruptJ20 and the DC Antifascist Coalition, and filmed members discussing plans to disrupt and "crash" the DeploraBall. According to an affidavit released by police, three people associated with the protest groups plotted to get into the National Press Club and tamper with the sprinkler system to release butyric acid, acting as a stink bomb, over the DeploraBall attendees. At least one conspirator had purchased tickets to the event, which were cancelled by the organizers upon seeing the Veritas videos. After the videos became public, a spokesperson for the protest groups claimed that their members knew Veritas was monitoring them, and deliberately fabricated the alleged DeploraBall plot, which they did not intend to actually carry out, in order to distract the Veritas infiltrator from their real protest plans. The video led to the arrests of three men involved in the plot, all of whom later pled guilty to conspiracy charges.

During the evening of January 19, hundreds of anti-Trump protesters demonstrated outside the National Press Building. Protesters clashed with police in riot gear, who formed a human shield to protect DeploraBall attendees as they arrived and entered the building. Protesters also threw bottles at attendees who were leaving the venue. One Trump supporter suffered a head injury after being hit by a protester. Ellison Barber of local CBS affiliate WUSA-TV reported that she had seen "at least four fights" outside the venue. A young boy at the protest, later identified by TMZ as the 11-year-old son of actor Drew Carey, told a Fox News reporter at the scene that he had started a fire in the street near the venue. Police eventually used pepper spray to disperse the protesters.

References

External links

2017 in Washington, D.C.
Alt-right events
Inauguration of Donald Trump
January 2017 events in the United States
Reactions to the election of Donald Trump
Far-right politics in the United States
Balls in the United States